The Netherlands men's national under-21 volleyball team represents Netherlands in international men's volleyball competitions and friendly matches under the age 21 and it is ruled by the Dutch Volleyball Association body that is an affiliate of the Federation of International Volleyball FIVB and also part of the European Volleyball Confederation CEV.

Results

FIVB U21 World Championship
 Champions   Runners up   Third place   Fourth place

Team

Current squad
The following players are the Dutch players that have competed in the 2018 Men's U20 Volleyball European Championship

References

External links
 www.volleybal.nl 

National men's under-21 volleyball teams
Volleyball|U
Volleyball in the Netherlands